Babak Matlab oglu Samidli (1974-2020) was an Azerbaijani military officer, and a colonel serving in the Azerbaijani Armed Forces. He was deputy commander of the 1st Army Corps.

Life and service 
Samidli was born in the Goychay District. In June 2018 he was promoted to rank of Lieutenant Colonel.  During the 2020 Nagorno-Karabakh war, Samidli commanded Azerbaijani forces in the Madagiz offensive. On 27 October, he gave an interview to Euronews announcing the capture of the Madagiz dam. Samidli died post-armistice on 23 November 2020, near Madagiz (renamed to Sugovushan) from an exploded land-mine. Samidli was part of a group that consisted of Armenian officials, Red Cross officials, and Russian peacekeepers collecting dead bodies and identifying missing soldiers. Four Armenian officials and one Russian peacekeeper were slightly wounded in the blast. On 9 December, the President of Azerbaijan, Ilham Aliyev signed a decree to posthumously award Samidli the Zafar Order.

References 

1974 births
People from Goychay District
2020 deaths
Azerbaijani colonels
Azerbaijani military personnel killed in action
Azerbaijani Land Forces personnel of the 2020 Nagorno-Karabakh war
Recipients of the Azerbaijan Democratic Republic 100th anniversary medal
Landmine victims